Santiago Vecino is a Uruguayan illustrator also known as Caveman. He is an artist in all concept, drawing, playing music, singing like a rock star, dancing, but best known for his work as concept and storyboard artist for the Evil Dead (2013 film) Hollywood movie, directed by Uruguayan Fede Álvarez.

Work 
Santiago was born in 1978 in the city of Montevideo. He has been drawing since early childhood. After finishing high school, he studied two years of architecture until he realized that he wanted to explore deeply his artistic side and started fine arts at the IENBA art school (2000). He also took courses in graphic design and animation. After a couple years, he started working professionally as an illustrator and kept on learning by himself until today. He has been drawing children illustrations, caricatures, graphic humor, animation, storyboards, concept art, matte painting, etc., for different worldwide clients. Parallel to his professional career, he keeps on exploring his own art projects. In 2012 he worked as a conceptual and storyboard artist for two upcoming Hollywood films, Evil Dead (2013 film) and Aztec Warrior.

References

External links 
 https://www.imdb.com/title/tt1288558/fullcredits?ref_=tt_ov_st_sm#cast
 http://www.santiago-vecino.com/
 http://santiagovecino.blogspot.com/
 http://uy.linkedin.com/pub/santiago-vecino/11/283/520
 https://www.google.com.uy/search?q=santiago+vecino&hl=es&biw=1536&bih=815&tbm=isch&tbo=u&source=univ&sa=X&ei=X1p1UdGZD5OI9QS6w4GICQ&sqi=2&ved=0CFIQsAQ
 http://www.multiverseros.com/:entrevista-a-santiago-vecino.html

Uruguayan illustrators
Uruguayan storyboard artists
People from Montevideo
1978 births
Living people